George Alex Tsamis (born June 14, 1967) is an American former professional baseball pitcher who is the current manager for the Kane County Cougars of the American Association of Professional Baseball. He pitched one season in Major League Baseball (MLB) for the Minnesota Twins in 1993.

After he retired from professional baseball in 1998, Tsamis became a manager in the independent minor leagues. He joined the Waterbury Spirit of the Northeast League in 1999 and later managed the New Jersey Jackals beginning in 2001. He left the Jackals to manage the St. Paul Saints in 2003 and managed them through the 2020 season before taking his job with the Cougars.

Tsamis is a four-time league champion as a manager. He led the Jackals to the 2001 and 2002 Northern League championships, then led the Saints to the 2004 Northern League Championship and the 2019 American Association championship.

Little League World Series 
George Tsamis represented the team from Campbell, California at the 1979 Little League World Series. His team lost the championship to Taiwan, 2-1.

Playing career 
Tsamis attended Stetson University, where he played college baseball for the Hatters under head coach Pete Dunn. From 1986 to 1988, he played collegiate summer baseball with the Falmouth Commodores of the Cape Cod Baseball League and was named a league all-star in 1988. He was named the TAAC Player of the Year in 1989.

Tsamis was drafted by the Twins in the 15th round of the 1989 MLB draft. He made his MLB debut in 1993, appearing in 41 games with a record of 1-2 with an ERA of 6.19. Arguably the highlight of Tsamis' MLB career came August 14, 1993. During the second game of a doubleheader against the Athletics, Tsamis threw 4 scoreless innings to close out the game and notch his first and only career major league save. He preserved the game for starting pitcher Mike Trombley.

Tsamis was a replacement player with the Los Angeles Dodgers during spring training prior to the 1995 season. Replacement players took over for the regular, unionized baseball players when the Major League Baseball Players Association (MLBPA) went on strike in 1994. The strike was resolved at the end of spring training, and Tsamis returned to the minor leagues, where he pitched until 1998. Due to his role as a replacement player, Tsamis was not permitted membership in the MLBPA.

Managerial career 
Tsamis managed the Waterbury Spirit (1999–2000) and New Jersey Jackals (2001–02), winning league titles with the Jackals in both his seasons. In 2003, he was hired to manage the Saints, then in the Northern League. The team moved to the American Association in 2006. Tsamis managed through Saints through the 2020 season, after which they left the American Association and became Triple-A affiliates of the Minnesota Twins.

On February 23, 2021, Tsamis was named manager of the Kane County Cougars, a former Low-A Midwest League club that later moved to the American Association due to the restructuring of Minor League Baseball. In moving to the Chicago suburbs, he retained his longtime coaching staff of Kerry Ligtenberg (pitching coach) and Ole Sheldon (hitting coach).

Tsamis recently managed the North Division in the American Association All-Star Game in Sioux Falls, SD.

References

External links

St. Paul Saints bio

1967 births
Living people
American Association of Professional Baseball managers
American expatriate baseball players in Canada
American people of Greek descent
Bangor Blue Ox players
Baseball players from California
Calgary Cannons players
Carolina Mudcats players
Falmouth Commodores players
Jacksonville Suns players
Major League Baseball pitchers
Major League Baseball replacement players
Meridian Brakemen players
Minnesota Twins players
Mohawk Valley Landsharks players
Newburgh Night Hawks players
Northern League (baseball, 1993–2010) managers
Orlando Sun Rays players
People from Campbell, California
Port City Roosters players
Portland Beavers players
Stetson Hatters baseball players
Visalia Oaks players
Waterbury Spirit players